The atom bomb is a nuclear weapon.

Atom(ic) bomb may also refer to:

Atomic Bomb (album), a 1997 album by Filipino rock band Rivermaya
Atom Bomb (album), a 2005 album by The Blind Boys of Alabama
"Atom Bomb" (song), a song on Fluke's 1996 album Risotto
Atom Bomb (film), a 1964 Malayalam language film

See also 
 A-bomb (disambiguation)